The leftover hash lemma is a lemma in cryptography first stated by Russell Impagliazzo, Leonid Levin, and Michael Luby.

Imagine that you have a secret key  that has  uniform random bits, and you would like to use this secret key to encrypt a message. Unfortunately, you were a bit careless with the key, and know that an adversary was able to learn the values of some  bits of that key, but you do not know which  bits. Can you still use your key, or do you have to throw it away and choose a new key? The leftover hash lemma tells us that we can produce a key of about  bits, over which the adversary has almost no knowledge. Since the adversary knows all but  bits, this is almost optimal.

That is why this is also called privacy amplification (see privacy amplification section in the article Quantum key distribution).

Randomness extractors achieve the same result, but use (normally) less randomness.

Let  be a 2-universal hash function. If 

The min-entropy is always less than or equal to the Shannon entropy. Note that  is the probability of correctly guessing . (The best guess is to guess the most probable value.) Therefore, the min-entropy measures how difficult it is to guess .

See also
 Universal hashing
 Min-entropy
 Rényi entropy
Information-theoretic security

References

C. H. Bennett, G. Brassard, and J. M. Robert. Privacy amplification by public discussion. SIAM Journal on Computing, 17(2):210-229, 1988.
C. Bennett, G. Brassard, C. Crepeau, and U. Maurer. Generalized privacy amplification. IEEE Transactions on Information Theory, 41, 1995.
J. Håstad, R. Impagliazzo, L. A. Levin and M. Luby. A Pseudorandom Generator from any One-way Function. SIAM Journal on Computing, v28 n4, pp. 1364-1396, 1999.

Theory of cryptography
Probability theorems